Edwin Ernesto Portillo (born November 17, 1962, in Metapán) is a former Salvadoran professional footballer and current manager.

Coaching career

CESSA
In 1996, he began his coaching career with CESSA, now called Isidro Metapán.

Fuerte San Francisco
He signed as new coach of Fuerte San Francisco in 1998.

Isidro Metapán
In 2000, Portillo signed as new coach of Isidro Metapán, replacing Nelson Mauricio Ancheta. Portillo led them to get promoted to the Primera División in 2001. In October 2001, Portillo was replaced by José Calazán.

Second return to Isidro Metapán
In October 2002, Portillo signed again as coach of Isidro Metapán, replacing Roberto Fabrizio. In June 2003, Portillo was replaced by Raúl Héctor Cocherari.

Once Lobos
In 2003, Portillo signed as coach of Once Lobos, replacing Jorge Rivas. In 2004, Portillo was replaced by Carlos Recinos.

Third return to Isidro Metapán
However, most of his success happened when he signed again as coach of Isidro Metapán in October 2006, replacing Rubén Alonso. He led the club to winning the Clausura 2007, Apertura 2008, Clausura 2009, Clausura 2010, Apertura 2010, Apertura 2011 and Apertura 2012. Also, he lost the Clausura 2012 final against Águila (1–2 defeat).

However, in March 2013, Portillo was replaced by Jorge Rodríguez (footballer, born 1971).

Águila
In February 2014, Portillo signed as new coach of Águila, replacing Raúl Martínez Sambulá for the rest of the Clausura 2014. In March 2014, Portillo was replaced by Jairo Ríos Rendón.

Leones de Occidente
In 2015, Portillo signed as new coach of Leones de Occidente.

Sonsonate
In October 2015, Portillo signed as new coach of Sonsonate for the rest of the Apertura 2015, replacing Héctor Jara. In April 2016, Portillo was replaced by William Renderos Iraheta.

Return to Leones de Occidente
In October 2016, Portillo signed again as coach of Leones de Occidente.

Fourth return to Isidro Metapán
Portillo signed again as coach of Isidro Metapán for the Clausura 2017, replacing Álvaro Misael Alfaro. Portillo led them to the semi-finals of that tournament, but they were defeated by Alianza 0–2 on aggregate.

In March 2018, Portillo was replaced by Agustín Castillo after a 0–3 defeat against Santa Tecla FC.

Fifth return to Isidro Metapán
In December 2018, it was announced that Agustín Castillo would be replaced by Portillo as new coach of Isidro Metapán for the Clausura 2019.

Honours

Manager

Club
A.D. Isidro Metapán
 Primera División
 Champion: Clausura 2007, Apertura 2008, Clausura 2009, Clausura 2010, Apertura 2010, Apertura 2011, Apertura 2012
 Runners-up: Clausura 2012

Achievements
20 October 2011. Edwin Portillo's Isidro Metapán became the first Salvadoran team to qualify for the quarter-finals (last eight) in the CONCACAF Champions League new format. He currently holds the record for the most Salvadoran club titles as a manager (7 club tournaments).

References

External links
 Edwin Portillo at Soccerway 

1962 births
Living people
Salvadoran football managers
C.D. Águila managers
Salvadoran footballers
Association football defenders
People from Metapán